John Donald Budge (June 13, 1915 – January 26, 2000) was an American tennis player. He is most famous as the first tennis player — male or female, and still the only American male — to win the Grand Slam, and to win all four Grand Slam events consecutively overall. Budge was the second man to complete the career Grand Slam after Fred Perry, and remains the youngest to achieve the feat. He won ten majors, of which six were Grand Slam events (consecutively, a men's record) and four Pro Slams, the latter achieved on three different surfaces. Budge is considered to have one of the best backhands in the history of tennis, with most observers rating it better than that of later player Ken Rosewall.

Budge is also the only man to have achieved the Triple Crown (winning singles, men's doubles and mixed doubles at the same tournament) on three separate occasions (Wimbledon in 1937 and 1938, and the US Championships in 1938), and the only man to have achieved it twice in one year. Budge was the world Number 1 amateur in 1937 and 1938 and world Number 1 professional in 1939, 1940 and 1942.

Early life
Budge was born in Oakland, California, the son of Scottish immigrant and former soccer player John "Jack" Budge, who had played several matches for the Rangers reserve team before emigrating to the United States, and Pearl Kincaid Budge. Growing up, he played a variety of sports before taking up tennis at age 13 at the urging of his older brother, Lloyd, who played tennis for the University of California team. He also had an older sister. He was red-headed, tall and slim, and his height would eventually help what is still considered one of the most powerful serves of all time. Budge studied at the University of California, Berkeley in late 1933 but left to play tennis with the U.S. Davis Cup auxiliary team.

Amateur career
Accustomed to hard-court surfaces in his native California, Budge had difficulty playing on the grass courts in the east. 

1932
Budge reached the semi finals of the West Canada championships in July, where he lost in five sets to Henry Prusoff. "The Oakland youngster carried brawny Hank Prusoff of Seattle to five sets, surprising most of the onlookers, including the tournament favorite from Puget Sound. The scores were 6-2, 3-6, 6-3, 2-6, 6-2, with Budge playing a calm and collected game all the way and letting the hardhitting Prusoff make the errors. The chop stroke of the Seattle man worked to perfection, particularly In the last set, and he always seemed to have something in reserve."

1933
At the Del Monte championships in May, Budge beat Wallace Bates in straight sets in final. In July, Budge beat John Murio in the final of the California State championship. "Tennis fans will be talking for days of the men's singles event and of Budge, whom the experts candidly admit "has everything." Not only has he the strokes of a champion, but the presence and strategy of one far beyond his years. Murio's most burning drives failed to ruffle one of the flaming red hairs on his head". In the final of the Colorado championships in Denver in July, Budge beat Jack Tidball in five sets.

1934
Budge beat Bud Chandler in the final in five sets to retain his California State championship title in June. "Chandler went to the net often throughout the match, while Budge elected to play a baseline game almost exclusively, going to the webbing only when forced to by chop or cross court shots; Chandler, exhausted after his gruelling five-set match with John Murio in the semi-final on Saturday, fought largely on his nerve against the Champion, and at the end of yesterday's strenuous competition again was completely exhausted."

1935
Budge beat Gene Mako in the final of the Palm Springs tournament in April. Budge beat Frank Shields in the final of the Newport Casino tournament in August. In the final of the Pacific Southwest tournament in September, Budge was leading 2 sets to 1 against Roderich Menzel, when Menzel retired, in order to preserve his energy for a mixed doubles match. Budge beat Bobby Riggs in the final of the Pacific Coast championships in October.

1936
In January, Budge beat Walter Senior in the final of the Northern California indoor event.
In April Budge won the North and south tournament at Pinehurst beating Hal Surface in three-straight sets for the loss of just one game with a "superb exhibition of speed and control". In June, Budge beat Dave Jones in the final of Queen's club tournament. Budge beat Riggs in the final of the Eastern championships in August. Budge beat Perry in the final of the Pacific Southwest tournament in September.
In October, Budge beat Walter Senior in the final of the Pacific Coast championships. In December Budge beat Riggs in the final of the Southern California midwinter tournament.

1937
In February, Budge beat Bryan Grant in the final of the Miami tournament.
In June, Budge beat Bunny Austin in the final at Queen's club tournament. "Seldom has a star of Austin's standing absorbed so crushing a defeat in full view of the public." Budge swept Wimbledon, winning the singles (beating Gottfried von Cramm in straight sets in the final), the men's doubles title with Gene Mako, and the mixed doubles crown with Alice Marble. In August, Budge beat Riggs in the final of the Newport Casino tournament. Budge beat von Cramm in the U. S. Championships final which "was a strange see-saw affair in which Budge twice lapsed from his normally brilliant genius guided game". Budge beat von Cramm again in the final of the Pacific Southwest tournament in September. Budge beat Riggs in the final of the Pacific Coast tournament in October. In December Budge won the Victorian championships beating John Bromwich in the final in a match in which "the hot, humid weather proved trying for the players". Budge gained the most fame for his match that year against von Cramm in the Davis Cup inter-zone finals against Germany. Trailing 1–4 in the final set, he came back to win 8–6. His victory allowed the US team to advance and to then win the Davis Cup for the first time in 12 years. For his efforts, he was named Associated Press Male Athlete of the Year and he became the first tennis player ever to be voted the James E. Sullivan Award as America's top amateur athlete. Budge was ranked World No. 1 amateur by A. Wallis Myers of The Daily Telegraph, Mervyn Weston, Daily Telegraph (Sydney), Pierre Gillou, Ned Potter, The Times, Harry Hopman, Alfred Chave, The Telegraph (Brisbane) and Pierre Goldschmidt, L'Auto.

1938
In 1938, Budge dominated amateur tennis defeating John Bromwich in the Australian final, Roderick Menzel in the French final, Henry "Bunny" Austin at Wimbledon, where he never lost a set (he also won the doubles and mixed doubles), and Gene Mako in the U.S. Championships final (winning doubles and mixed doubles also), to become the first person ever to win the Grand Slam in tennis. He also is the youngest man in history to complete the "Career Grand Slam" (the four majors in one's career) and "Full (Grand) Slam" (four majors held at one time (in row)). He completed that on June 11, 1938, in winning the French singles, two days before his 23rd birthday. Budge beat Ladislav Hecht in the final of the Czech championships in Prague in July. Budge beat Sidney Wood in the final of the Newport Casino tournament in August. Budge was ranked World No. 1 amateur by Ray Bowers, A. Wallis Myers of The Daily Telegraph, Pierre Gillou, Ned Potter, Pierre Goldschmidt, L'Auto, The Times (London), F. Gordon Lowe of The Scotsman, Dr. G. H. McElhone of The Sydney Morning Herald, "International" of The Referee, Mervyn Weston, Daily Telegraph (Sydney), Jack Crawford and Alfred Chave, The Telegraph (Brisbane).

Professional career

1939
Budge turned professional in October 1938 after winning the Grand Slam, and thereafter played mostly head-to-head matches. In 1939, he beat the two reigning kings of professional tennis, Ellsworth Vines, 22 matches to 17, and Fred Perry, 28 matches to 8. That year, he also won two major pro tournaments, the French Pro Championship over Vines and the Wembley Pro tournament over Hans Nüsslein. He also finished in first place on the European tour in the summer that also featured Vines, Tilden and Stoefen. Budge was ranked World No. 1 pro by Bowers, Didier Poulain of L'Auto and Alfred Chave, The Telegraph (Brisbane).

1940
There was no World series professional tour in 1940 but seven principal tournaments. Budge kept his world crown by winning four of these events: the Southeastern Pro at Miami Beach (beating Perry in the final), the North & South Pro at Pinehurst (beating Dick Skeen in the final), the National Open at White Sulphur Springs (beating Bruce Barnes in the final) and the United States Pro Championship (beating Perry in the final). Budge was ranked World No. 1 pro by Bowers.

On July 29, 1940, Budge played an exhibition match in front of 2,000 people at the Cosmopolitan Club in Harlem, New York City against the American Tennis Association's top player Jimmie McDaniel. This is believed to be the first interracial tennis match played before a large audience to take place in the United States.

1941
In 1941, Budge played another major tour beating the 48-year-old Bill Tilden, the outcome being 47–6 plus one tie. Budge (who had only recently left hospital) lost his opening match in the U. S. Pro championships to John Faunce. "You see, Don was in the hospital a couple of weeks ago fell down some stairs and banged up his nose and left ear. He didn't have his court legs today and naturally that was my cue to make him run and. believe me, I never hit better drop shots in my life than I hit today. I could put that ball on a dime!" said Faunce afterwards.

1942
In 1942, Budge won his last major tour over Bobby Riggs, Frank Kovacs, Perry and Les Stoefen. He also won the U.S. Pro at Forest Hills, crushing Riggs 6–2, 6–2, 6–2 in the final. The crowd booed when Riggs was denied a request to wear spiked shoes. After that many of the top pros, including Budge, became involved in World War 2. Budge was ranked World No. 1 pro by Bowers and by the USPLTA.

Military service

In 1942, Budge joined the United States Army Air Forces to serve in World War II. At the beginning of 1943, in an obstacle course, he tore a muscle in his shoulder. In his book 'A Tennis Memoir' page 144 he said:

This permanently hindered his playing abilities. During his wartime duty he played some exhibitions for the troops in particular during the summer 1945 with the war winding down, Budge played in a US Army (Budge-Frank Parker) – US Navy (Riggs – Wayne Sabin) competition under the Davis Cup format: the main confrontations were the Budge-Riggs meetings knowing that both Americans were the best players in the world in 1942 just before being enlisted in the U.S. Armed Forces and again when they came back to the professional circuit in 1945. In the first match, on the island of Guam, Budge trounced Riggs 6–2, 6–2. On the island of Peleliu, Budge won again 6–4, 7–5. Riggs won the next two matches against Budge, 6–1, 6–1 (island of Ulithi) and 6–3, 4–6, 6–1 (island of Saipan). Budge confided in Parker his disbelief at losing two matches in a row to Riggs. In the fifth and final match on the island of Tinian, scheduled for the first week of August 1945, Riggs defeated Budge 6–8, 6–1, 8–6. This was the first time Budge had been beaten by Riggs in a series (Riggs also won three matches out of five against the amateur Parker, both holder and future titlist of the U.S. Amateur Nationals at Forest Hills) thereby giving Riggs an important psychological edge in their forthcoming peacetime tours.

Post war

1946
In 1946, Budge lost narrowly to Riggs in their U.S. tour, 24 matches to 22. Riggs thereby established himself as the world No. 1. According to Kramer,

The hierarchy was confirmed at the U.S. Pro, held at Forest Hills where Riggs easily defeated Budge in the last round. There was a tournament circuit in 1946.  Budge won events at Memphis in June (beating Riggs in the final), Richmond in June (beating Riggs in the final), Philadelphia in July (beating Van Horn in the final) and San Francisco in October (beating Riggs in the final). Budge finished second in the points table behind Riggs.

1947
In 1947 Budge beat Riggs in two European tours, one early in the year and one in the summer. According to Riggs, Budge still had a very powerful, very deadly overhead and rather than winning outright very many points with his lobbing, he actually achieved two other goals: his constant lobbing led Budge to play somewhat deeper at the net than he would have otherwise, thereby making it easier for Riggs to hit passing shots for winners; and the constant lobbing helped to wear Budge down by forcing him to run back to the backline time after time. Riggs stayed the pro king by defeating Budge in the U.S. Pro final in five sets, so Riggs would face Kramer on the big tour in 1948.

1948-1961
Budge reached two more U.S. Pro finals, losing in 1949 at Forest Hills to Riggs and in 1953 in Cleveland to Pancho Gonzales. In 1954, Budge recorded his last significant victory in a North American tour with Pancho Gonzales, Pancho Segura, and Frank Sedgman when, in Los Angeles, he defeated Gonzales, by then the best player in the world. In April 1955 Budge won the U. S. Pro Clay Court Championships at Fort Lauderdale beating Riggs in the final. Budge was playing very infrequently by now.  He continued playing until 1961, when he lost in the Southern Pro final to Jack Arkinstall in straight sets. "He still hits a wonderful backhand, but he's five years older than I am and I guess I just got around too fast for him," said Arkinstall.

Later years and honors
He appeared on the Ed Sullivan Show in 1948 and the Steve Allen Plymouth Show in 1951. He appeared as himself in the 1953 film Pat and Mike.

After retiring from competition, Budge turned to coaching and conducted tennis clinics for children. According to Riggs' 1949 autobiography as of that writing, Budge owned a laundry in New York with Sidney Wood as well as a bar in Oakland. A gentleman on and off the court, he was much in demand for speaking engagements and endorsed various lines of sporting goods. With the advent of the Open era in tennis, in 1968 he returned to play at Wimbledon in the Veteran's doubles. In 1973, at the age of 58, he and former champion Frank Sedgman teamed up to win the Veteran's Doubles Championship at Wimbledon before an appreciative crowd.

Budge was the resident tennis pro at the Montego Bay Racquet Club in Jamaica in 1977. In October 1978 he became the tennis pro at the Cambridge Towers Hotel in Las Vegas. After a few months he was terminated but he sued the owner for breach of his five-year contract and was awarded $455,041.

Budge was inducted into the National Lawn Tennis Hall of Fame, now the International Tennis Hall of Fame, at Newport, Rhode Island, in 1964. He was elected to the Bay Area Sports Hall of Fame in 1992. The once-gravel tennis courts at Bushrod Park in north Oakland, which he played on as a youth, are named for him.

He is referenced in the 1977 Broadway musical Annie in the song "I Think I'm Gonna Like It Here." When Annie says she's never picked up a tennis racket, Daddy Warbucks' secretary tells an underling: "Have an instructor here at noon. Oh, and get that Don Budge fellow if he's available." The reference is technically an anachronism, as the story is set in 1933, at which time Budge was an undergraduate at Berkeley and had not yet achieved prominence.

Personal life 
He wed Deirdre Conselman (1922-1978), the daughter of screenwriter and cartoonist William Conselman, at St. Chrysostom's Episcopal Church in Chicago on June 2, 1941. In his later years he lived in Dingman's Ferry, Pennsylvania, with his second wife, Loriel.

In December 1999, Budge was injured in an automobile accident from which he never fully recovered. He died on January 26, 2000, at a nursing home in Scranton, Pennsylvania, aged 84. He had two sons, David and Jeffrey.

Assessment
Budge is a consensus pick for being one of the greatest players of all time. He had a graceful, overpowering backhand that he hit with a slight amount of topspin and that, combined with his quickness and his serve, made him the best player of his time. E. Digby Baltzell wrote in 1994 that Budge and Laver "have usually been rated at the top of any all-time World Champions list, Budge having a slight edge." Will Grimsley wrote in 1971 that Budge "is considered by many to be foremost among the all-time greats." Paul Metzler, in his analysis of ten of the all-time greats, singles out Budge as the greatest player before World War II, and gives him second place overall behind Jack Kramer. In 1978, Ellsworth Vines ranked his all-time top 10 in Tennis Myth and Method and rated Budge number one.

Jack Kramer himself has written that Budge was, in the long run, the greatest player who ever lived although Ellsworth Vines topped him when at the height of his game. Kramer said:

In his 1979 autobiography, Kramer considered the best player ever to have been either Don Budge (for consistent play) or Ellsworth Vines (at the height of his game). The next four best were, chronologically, Bill Tilden, Fred Perry, Bobby Riggs, and Pancho Gonzales. All of these sources were written, after Rod Laver completed his second, and Open, Grand Slam in 1969.

In 1983, Fred Perry ranked the greatest male players of all time and put them in to two categories, before World War 2 and after.  Perry's pre-WWII nominees all below Tilden and excluding himself “Budge Cochet Ellsworth Vines ’so powerful!’ Gottfried von Cramm Jack Crawford Jan Sato Jean Borotra Bunny Austin Roderick Menzel Baron Umberto de Morpurgo”.

In early 1986 Inside Tennis, a magazine edited in Northern California, devoted parts of four issues to a lengthy article called "Tournament of the Century", an imaginary tournament to determine the greatest of all time. 25 players in all were named by the 37 experts in their lists of the ten best. The magazine then ranked them in descending order by total number of points assigned. The top eight players in overall points, with their number of first-place votes, were: Rod Laver (9), John McEnroe (3), Don Budge (4), Jack Kramer (5), Björn Borg (6), Pancho Gonzales (1), Bill Tilden (6), and Lew Hoad (1). McEnroe was still an active player and Laver and Borg had only recently retired. In the imaginary tournament, Laver beat McEnroe in the finals in five sets.

In 1988, a panel consisting of Bud Collins, Cliff Drysdale, and Butch Buchholz ranked their top five male tennis players of all time. Drysdale listed Budge number three behind Laver and Borg.  Buchholz and Collins did not include Budge on their lists.

More recently, an Associated Press poll conducted in 1999 ranked Budge fifth, following Laver, Pete Sampras, Tilden, and Borg.  Even more recently, in 2006, a panel of former players and experts was asked by TennisWeek to assemble a draw for a fantasy tournament to determine who was the greatest of all time. The top eight seeds were Roger Federer, Laver, Sampras, Borg, Tilden, Budge, Kramer, and McEnroe.

In the early years of the 21st century, Sidney Wood compiled his list of the Greatest Players of All Time (later published posthumously in a memoir "The Wimbledon final that never was and other tennis tales from a bygone era").  Wood first entered Wimbledon in 1927 and won the title in 1931.  "From that time on, through to the late 1970s (doubles only towards the end), I was privileged to compete against virtually every top player in the world" said Wood.  Wood ranked Budge number one in his list, saying the decision was a "no-brainer" and said Budge was "recognized by his peers as the one player to have commanded not only every shot in the book for every surface, but also to have been blessed with the single most destructive tennis weapon ever- a bludgeon backhand struck with a sixteen ounce 'Paul Bunyan' bat."

Major finals

Grand Slam tournaments

Singles: 7 (6 titles, 1 runner-up)

Doubles: 7 (4 titles, 3 runner-ups)

Pro Slam tournaments

Singles: 8 (4 titles, 4 runner-ups)

Performance timeline
Don Budge joined professional tennis in 1939 and was unable to compete in the Grand Slam tournaments.

Single titles

Amateur era
Singles (1934–1938) : 26 titles

Records
 These records were attained in pre-Open Era of tennis.
 Records in bold indicate peer-less achievements.

See also
 All-time tennis records – men's singles
 Open Era tennis records – men's singles

References

Sources
 Sporting Gentlemen: Men's Tennis from the Age of Honor to the Cult of the Superstar, (1994), E. Digby Baltzell
 Tennis: Its History, People and Events, (1971), Will Grimsley
 Tennis Styles and Stylists, (1969), Paul Metzler
 The Game, My 40 Years in Tennis (1979), Jack Kramer with Frank Deford
 Tennis Is My Racket, (1949), Bobby Riggs

Further reading
 Fisher, Marshall Jon (2009). A Terrible Splendor: Three Extraordinary Men, a World Poised for War and the Greatest Tennis Match Ever Played.

External links

 
 
 
 

American male tennis players
American people of Scottish descent
American tennis coaches
Australian Championships (tennis) champions
California Golden Bears men's tennis players
French Championships (tennis) champions
International Tennis Hall of Fame inductees
James E. Sullivan Award recipients
Sportspeople from Oakland, California
Tennis commentators
Tennis people from California
United States National champions (tennis)
Wimbledon champions (pre-Open Era)
1915 births
2000 deaths
Road incident deaths in Pennsylvania
Grand Slam (tennis) champions in men's singles
Grand Slam (tennis) champions in mixed doubles
Grand Slam (tennis) champions in men's doubles
Professional tennis players before the Open Era
United States Army Air Forces personnel of World War II
World number 1 ranked male tennis players